Mohamed Shiraz (born 13 February 1995) is a Sri Lankan cricketer. He made his first-class debut for Colts Cricket Club in the 2016–17 Premier League Tournament on 29 November 2016. He made his List A debut for Kegalle District in the 2016–17 Districts One Day Tournament on 19 March 2017.

In February 2019, he was named in Sri Lanka's Test squad for their series against South Africa, but he did not play. In March 2019, he was named in Colombo's squad for the 2019 Super Provincial One Day Tournament. In October 2020, he was drafted by the Galle Gladiators for the inaugural edition of the Lanka Premier League. In August 2021, he was named in the SLC Reds team for the 2021 SLC Invitational T20 League tournament. However, prior to the first match, he tested positive for COVID-19, ruling him out of the tournament.

In June 2022, he was named in the Sri Lanka A squad for their matches against Australia A during Australia's tour of Sri Lanka.

References

External links
 

1995 births
Living people
Sri Lankan cricketers
Colts Cricket Club cricketers
Kegalle District cricketers
Sportspeople from Kandy
Galle Gladiators cricketers